Chuchot Shama is a village in the Leh district of Ladakh, India. It is located in the Leh tehsil. The village is located on the banks of river Indus (sindh).

Demographics
According to the 2011 census of India, Chuchot Shama has 296 households. The effective literacy rate (i.e. the literacy rate of population excluding children aged 6 and below) is 81.43%.

References

Villages in Leh tehsil